The Kum Kapu demonstration occurred in the Kumkapı district of Constantinople on July 27, 1890. It ensued in skirmishing in which several demonstrators and four police officers  were killed. The intent of the demonstration was "..to awaken the maltreated Armenians and to make the Sublime Porte fully aware of the miseries of the Armenians."

Background 

Towards the close of the nineteenth century, Armenian revolutionary societies began to agitate for reform and renewed European attention to the Armenian Question. The Hnchak party in particular utilized the tactic of mass demonstration to hasten the process. They had been suspected to be behind an earlier June 1890 protest in Erzerum that resulted in a massacre.

July 27, 1890
On 27 July 1890, Harutiun Jangülian, Mihran Damadian and Hambartsum Boyajian interrupted the Divine Liturgy at the Armenian Cathedral in Constantinople to read a manifesto and denounce the indifference of the Armenian patriarch and Armenian National Assembly.

They soon forced the patriarch to join a procession heading to Yıldız Palace to demand implementation of Article 61 of the 1878 Treaty of Berlin. Even as the procession was gathering, police surrounded the crowd, and shots were fired that resulted in a number of deaths, including four policemen and three protestors.

Result
The Hunchaks concluded that the demonstrations at Kum Kapu were unsuccessful. At the same time, while there was no clear result from the event, the Hunchak press praised the courage shown by those present. Similar demonstrations on a lesser scale followed throughout most of the 1890s.

Notes

1890 protests
Rebellions in the Ottoman Empire
19th century in Armenia
Conflicts in 1890
1890 in the Ottoman Empire
Armenian rebellions in the Ottoman Empire
Rebellions in Turkey
Riots and civil disorder in the Ottoman Empire
July 1890 events
19th century in Istanbul
Demonstrations